Bellefontaine is an unincorporated community in Webster County, Mississippi, United States. Its ZIP code is 39737.

History
In the early 1900s, Bellefontaine had a money order post office and three churches.  Several artesian wells had been found at and near the settlement.

References

Unincorporated communities in Webster County, Mississippi
Unincorporated communities in Mississippi